Humboldt High School may refer to:

Humboldt High School (Iowa) — Humboldt, Iowa
Humboldt High School (Kansas) — Humboldt, Kansas
Humboldt High School (Tennessee) — Humboldt, Tennessee
Humboldt Senior High School — Saint Paul, Minnesota
Humboldt Collegiate, Humboldt, Saskatchewan